Bristol is a town in Grafton County, New Hampshire, United States. The population was 3,244 at the 2020 census. It is home to Wellington State Park, Sugar Hill State Forest, and Profile Falls on the Smith River. Surrounded by hills and lakes, Bristol includes the lower two-thirds of Newfound Lake, a resort area.

The primary settlement in town, where 1,911 people resided at the 2020 census, is defined by the U.S. Census Bureau as the Bristol census-designated place (CDP) and is located at the intersection of New Hampshire routes 3A and 104.

History

Bristol was taken from Bridgewater and New Chester (now Hill) and incorporated June 24, 1819. Colonel Peter Sleeper, Benjamin Emmons, and others commenced a settlement here in 1770.

Extensive deposits of fine sand or clay similar to the "Bristol Sand" used in Bristol, England, to make fine china and pottery gave the town its name. Here the sand was used to make a superior quality brick, marketed as Bristol brick. With water power from the Newfound River, the town was a center of manufacturing in the early days for goods such as paper, leather, woolens, flannel, bedsteads and piano stools.

On January 16, 1884, the town of Bristol voted to accept the gift of a library building and land from Josiah Minot and Solomon Sleeper and to manage and maintain a public library. The Minot–Sleeper Library became the first building erected to specifically house a public library in the Lakes Region at the time, when it was officially opened to the community in 1885. On August 15, 2012, a groundbreaking ceremony was held in celebration of the library's expansion. In February 2013, the new addition was ready for use.

Bristol is one of four towns with shoreline on Newfound Lake, which has been a tourist destination since the mid-19th century. Farmers at first rented rooms and provided meals, but in the 1870s, hotels including the Hotel Bristol and G. G. Brown Hotel were built. In 1874, Bristol was the terminus of the Franklin and Bristol Branch railroad. The New Hampshire Central Railroad was planned to pass through Bristol. In the 1920s, W. F. Darling created a compound of about one hundred cottages for rent, first known as Hiland Park and later as Bungalo Village. In 2004, the compound was sold to a proprietor who sold individual cottages to permanent owners.

In 2022, Bristol inaugurated a new solar array. Local media highlighted the array in the context of town's energy independence, which dated from the 1800s when hydropower provided all the town's energy.

Geography

Bristol is drained by the Pemigewasset River (forming the southeastern boundary of the town), the Smith River (on the town's short southern boundary) and the Newfound River, draining Newfound Lake and most of the center of town. Bristol lies fully within the Merrimack River watershed.

Bristol is served by state routes 3A and 104.

Demographics

As of the census of 2010, there were 3,054 people, 1,283 households, and 851 families residing in the town. There were 2,488 housing units, of which 1,205, or 48.4%, were vacant. 1,089 of the vacant units were for seasonal or recreational use. The racial makeup of the town was 96.9% white, 0.3% African American, 0.2% Native American, 0.7% Asian, 0.0% Native Hawaiian or Pacific Islander, 0.3% some other race, and 1.6% from two or more races. 1.1% of the population were Hispanic or Latino of any race.

Of the 1,283 households, 29.3% had children under the age of 18 living with them, 49.0% were headed by married couples living together, 11.1% had a female householder with no husband present, and 33.7% were non-families. 26.7% of all households were made up of individuals, and 9.5% were someone living alone who was 65 years of age or older. The average household size was 2.36, and the average family size was 2.81.

In the town, 21.5% of the population were under the age of 18, 7.0% were from 18 to 24, 23.6% from 25 to 44, 32.4% from 45 to 64, and 15.5% were 65 years of age or older. The median age was 43.5 years. For every 100 females, there were 98.2 males. For every 100 females age 18 and over, there were 95.3 males.

For the period 2011-2015, the estimated median annual income for a household was $50,080, and the median income for a family was $56,161. Male full-time workers had a median income of $43,627 versus $35,921 for females. The per capita income for the town was $25,353. 8.7% of the population and 5.0% of families were below the poverty line. 15.4% of the population under the age of 18 and 4.3% of those 65 or older were living in poverty.

Education
It is within the Newfound Area School District. Schools in Bristol include Bristol Elementary School, Newfound Memorial Middle School, and Newfound Regional High School.

Notable people 

 Luther Atwood (1820–1868), chemist in the oil industry  
 Nathaniel S. Berry (1796–1894), 28th governor of New Hampshire
 John Cheever (1912–1982), writer
 E. Maude Ferguson (1883–1932), first woman to serve in the New Hampshire Senate
 Benjamin Flanders (1816–1896), Reconstruction governor of Louisiana; mayor of New Orleans
 Luther C. Ladd (1843–1861), frequently cited as the first Union soldier killed in the American Civil War
 Lenny McNab (c. 1971), Food Network chef 
 Fred Lewis Pattee (1863–1950), writer and professor of American literature; born and raised in Bristol

See also

New Hampshire Historical Marker No. 269: E. Maude Ferguson, New Hampshire’s First Woman State Senator

References

External links
 
 Minot–Sleeper Library
 New Hampshire Economic and Labor Market Information Bureau Profile

 
Towns in Grafton County, New Hampshire
Populated places established in 1819
Towns in New Hampshire